"Whatcha Say" is the debut single by American singer Jason Derulo and the first single released from his self-titled debut album. It was available for digital download on May 5, 2009, and released as a single on August 4, 2009. The song incorporates Imogen Heap's 2005 single "Hide and Seek", which is heavily sampled and used as the chorus.  It was produced by J.R. Rotem with additional production by German record producer Fuego, and topped the Billboard Hot 100 for one week.

He recorded a French-English version with French Guiana singer Fanny J in 2010. A second music video has also been released.

Background and composition
After attending performing arts schools, such as The American Musical and Dramatic Academy, and honing his talents as a singer and dancer, as well as acting in theatre productions like Ragtime and Smokey Joe's Cafe, Derulo won the grand prize on the 2006 season finale of the TV show Showtime at the Apollo. Derulo was discovered by music producer J.R. Rotem, who signed him to his record label Beluga Heights Records and Warner Bros. Records. From 2006 to 2009, Derulo wrote songs for artists such as Diddy, Danity Kane, Donnie Klang, Sean Kingston, Cassie, and Lil Wayne, before gearing up to release his debut single, "Whatcha Say".

In an interview with Digital Spy, Derulo talked about the inspiration for the song. He said, "Basically my brother called me one day and said, 'I cheated on my girl, but I love her so much and I hope she'll give me one more shot'. I found his story really compelling, so I just went into the studio and tried it out. You know, people go through that kind of thing every day, which is why the song is so relatable. She did take my brother back though and they're actually engaged now, so it all worked out good in the end." Regarding the heavy sampling of "Hide and Seek" by Imogen Heap, Derulo called Heap "an incredible talent" and stated that she was "in love with the song [Whatcha Say]".

The song is written in the key of G minor and the tempo of 144 BPM.

Critical reception
"Whatcha Say" received mixed reviews. Glenn Gamboa of Newsday wrote: "For fans of Imogen Heap's "Hide and Seek", the new Jason Derulo single "Whatcha Say" – which liberally samples from the song and even uses Heap's chorus as his own chorus – may be hard to swallow. But Derulo weaves easily in and out of Heap's parts and matches his autotuned vocals to hers pretty well to craft a catchy, if derivative, little number." Upon its November 2009 UK release, noted R&B writer Pete Lewis of 'Blues & Soul' described the single as "Blending pounding beats and Derulo's rich, soulful vocals with an instantly-infectious pop hook sampled from alternative/indie songstress Imogen Heap".

Commercial performance
"Whatcha Say" debuted on the Billboard Hot 100 at number 54 in the issue dated August 4, 2009. It reached number one in the issue dated November 12, 2009. The song also reached the number-one spot on the Canadian Nielsen SoundScan Digital Songs chart. "Whatcha Say" entered and peaked on the UK Singles Chart on November 22, 2009 at number 3.

By June 2014, the single had sold over 4 million digital copies in the US.

Promotion
"Whatcha Say" was performed live by Derulo on Thanksgiving in Philadelphia for the 90th anniversary of the 6abc IKEA Thanksgiving Day Parade. 
The song was featured in Ben Affleck's film The Town.

The song was also featured on the popular CW show, Gossip Girl, in the episode "Treasure of Serena Madre", which premiered on November 30, 2009.

Music video
The music video was released as the free video of the week on iTunes on October 27, 2009. In the music video, Derulo is seen holding with his love interest on a couch inside a home invaded
by sunlights, and later on during the video, he is outside her door, waiting impatiently for her to forgive him, and worrying her to let him in, which goes after the lyrics in his song, "So let me in, give me another chance..." The music video premiered on  November 16, 2009 on AMTV. A music video was also released for the acoustic version, which features J. R. Rotem playing the piano.

Track listing
CD single
 "Whatcha Say" – 3:42
 "Whatcha Say" (Acoustic Version) – 3:42

Digital EP
 "Whatcha Say" – 3:42
 "Whatcha Say" (Acoustic Version) – 3:42
 "Whatcha Say" (Klubjumpers Remix Radio) – 4:03
 "Whatcha Say" (Johnny Vicious Remix) – 7:32
 "Whatcha Say" (Wawa Remix Radio) – 3:24

Maxi CD single
 "Whatcha Say" – 3:42
 "Whatcha Say" (Acoustic Version) – 3:42
 "Whatcha Say" (Klubjumpers Remix Radio) – 4:03
 "Whatcha Say" (Johnny Vicious Remix) – 7:32
 "Whatcha Say" (Wawa Remix Radio) – 3:24
 "Whatcha Say" (video) – 3:46

Charts

Weekly charts

Year-end charts

All-time charts

Certifications

See also
 List of number-one singles in 2010 (New Zealand)
 List of number-one R&B hits of 2009 (UK)
 List of Hot 100 number-one singles of 2009 (U.S.)
 List of Mainstream Top 40 number-one hits of 2009 (U.S.)
 List of Billboard Rhythmic number-one songs of the 2000s

References

External links
 

2009 songs
2009 debut singles
Asylum Records singles
Billboard Hot 100 number-one singles
Jason Derulo songs
Number-one singles in New Zealand
Song recordings produced by J. R. Rotem
Songs about infidelity
Songs written by Imogen Heap
Songs written by J. R. Rotem
Warner Records singles